José Ángel González Serna (born 12 August 1959) is a Mexican politician affiliated with the PAN. He currently serving as Deputy of the LXII Legislature of the Mexican Congress representing Aguascalientes.

References

1959 births
Living people
People from Aguascalientes City
Members of the Chamber of Deputies (Mexico)
National Action Party (Mexico) politicians
21st-century Mexican politicians